François Crépieul (March 16, 1638 —1702) was a Jesuit missionary in Canada and vicar apostolic for the Montagnais Indians.

Crépieul was born in Arles, France.  As a youth he studied in the Jesuit college of his native town and in that of Douai, becoming a member of the order at Tournai in 1659. He continued his studies at Lille and Douai and taught at Lille and Cambrai. In 1670 he sailed for Canada. Upon the completion of his theological studies in the College of Quebec, he was assigned in October 1671 to the Tadoussac region, where, with untiring devotion and great success he toiled among the Montagnais and Algonquin tribes for twenty-eight years. Writing to his brethren he tells them that the life of a Montagnais missionary is a tedious and prolonged martyrdom, and that his journeys and the cabins of the savages are truly schools of patience, penance, and resignation. For the benefit of his fellow missionaries Crépieul wrote a series of instructions embodying the results of his long service among the Indians, which are interesting and practical. These observations are given in the sixty-third volume of Reuben Gold Thwaites' The Jesuit Relations. In 1696 or 1697 he was appointed vicar apostolic for the Montagnais and, on the discontinuance of the mission a few years later, moved to Quebec, where he spent the rest of his life. Claude Dablon, superior of all the missions in Canada, styles him "a veritable apostle".

References
 J.S. Camille de Rochemonteix, Les Jésuites et la Nouvelle-France au XVIIe siècle (Paris, 1895–96)
Reuben Gold Thwaites, The Jesuit Relations, LVI, 301. 302. Available on line here
 Carlos Sommervogel, Bibliothèque de la Campagnie de Jesus, II, 1652, I
James Constantine Pilling, Bibliography of the Algonquian Languages (Washington, 1891), 98, 99
This article incorporates text from the 1913 Catholic Encyclopedia article "François Crépieul" by Edward P. Spillane, a publication now in the public domain.

1638 births
1702 deaths
17th-century French Jesuits
French Roman Catholic missionaries
Roman Catholic missionaries in Canada
Jesuit missionaries in New France